Whitton was an unincorporated community in Jo Daviess County, Illinois, United States. In 1931, it had a population of about 40. It is located near the Hanover Bluff Nature Preserve.

Notes

Unincorporated communities in Jo Daviess County, Illinois
Unincorporated communities in Illinois